Belavia, formally Belavia Belarusian Airlines, is the flag carrier and national airline of Belarus, headquartered in Minsk. The state-owned company had, as of 2007, 1,017 employees. Belavia serves a network of routes between Commonwealth of Independent States, as well as some Middle East destinations, from its base at Minsk National Airport.

Following the Ryanair Flight 4978 incident on 23 May 2021, the airline has been banned from the European Union, the United Kingdom, Switzerland, Ukraine and Serbia.

History

Early years

On 7 November 1933, the first Belarusian air terminal opened in Minsk. In the next spring, 3 Po-2 aircraft landed in Minsk. They became the first aircraft of the Belarusian air fleet. In 1936 the first regular air route between Minsk and Moscow was established. In the summer of 1940, the Belarusian civil aviation group was officially founded.

Development since the 2000s
Between 2003 and 2009, the airline has seen its passenger numbers double and in 2009 handled just under 700,000 customers.

Three least Bombardier CRJ 100 aircraft were introduced on regional services from Minsk. The first one was delivered in February 2007, with the other two later in 2007. They directly replaced the aging Antonov An-24 and Tupolev Tu-134 aircraft. It was looking to lease two Bombardier CRJ-700s in 2010. Belavia had also planned to retire its remaining Tupolev Tu-154Ms by 2011 following the retirement of its last Tupolev Tu-134 in summer 2009 which was replaced by an ex-FlyLAL Boeing 737-500. On 27 June 2014, an order was announced for three Boeing 737-800 aircraft to be acquired directly by Belavia. The first of these was delivered in August 2016.

In August 2016, Belavia received their first aircraft with their new livery. This is the first re-branding since the company's founding in 1996 on its 20 years anniversary. The new livery was applied a brand new Boeing 737-800. The much newer 737s replaced the aging Tupolev Tu-154s. On 1 October 2016, Belavia retired their two remaining Tupolev Tu-154s from scheduled services as one of the last airlines worldwide to do so.

In 2019, the company employed nearly 1,900 people, and generated a turnover of 374 million euros with an operating result of 49 million euros. During this year it carried almost 4 million passengers, an increase of more than 15% compared to the 2018 figure.

Several employees who participated in 2020 Belarusian protests were forced to leave their jobs.

Sanctions
On 24 May 2021, the British government suspended Belavia's operating permit in response to the Ryanair Flight 4978 incident. The European Union and Ukraine subsequently banned Belarusian airliners from entering their airspace or using their airports, effectively banning Belavia which led to the suspension of vast parts of their route network.

Also in 2021, Belavia was accused of orchestrating the influx of illegal migrants during 2021 Belarus–European Union border crisis. In September 2021 it has been reported that Belavia might face to lose the majority of its current fleet as its lessors might be no longer allowed to lease them out to Belarusian airlines as part of new embargoes. At this point Belavia owned 18 smaller, older aircraft, but had rented several modern jets from western companies, with the Irish AerCap with 6 and the Denmark-based Nordic Aviation Capital with 7 aircraft being the most important suppliers. On 16 November, the European Union confirmed the termination of all aircraft leases to Belarus by European lessors, which forces the airline to return half of their current fleet on short notice.

On 2 December 2021, Belavia was added to the sanctions list of the European Union. Switzerland joined the EU sanctions on 20 December. On April 8, 2022, the US Department of Commerce restricted flights on Belarusian owned or operated aircraft manufactured in the US along with Aeroflot, Aviastar, Azur Air, Rossiya and Utair from flying into Belarus or Russia. It seems the US wants to reclaim ownership of the intellectual property. On 16 June 2022 the US broadened its restrictions on Belavia after violations of the sanctions' regime were detected. The effect of the restrictions is to ground the US-manufactured part of its fleet.

Destinations 

Prior to the COVID-19 pandemic, Belavia operated flights to Asia, Europe, and Africa from its base at Minsk National Airport. In addition to scheduled destinations listed here, Belavia operates charter flights to leisure destinations and VIP charters. On the eve of the Ryanair Flight 4978 forced takedown incident, it served one domestic destination and 54 international destinations in 32 countries. As a result of the subsequent ban on Belarusian airliners entering the EU, UK and Ukrainian airspace, the airline is effectively stripped off all but twenty of these destinations: owing to the geographical constraints, access to Chișinău (Moldova), Kaliningrad (Russia), and Belgrade (Serbia) has become de facto impossible, despite these three non-EU member states not having issued any independent travel bans on Belavia. On 28 May 2021, the airline confirmed the cancellation of flights that would otherwise be forced to pass through restricted airspace as well as their ongoing efforts to reroute the Istanbul, Turkey, connection, up to this point handled using a straight route over Ukraine, Moldova, Romania as well as Bulgaria's territorial waters.

Codeshare agreements
Belavia has codeshare agreements with the following airlines as of May 2022:

 airBaltic
 Air France
 Austrian Airlines
 Czech Airlines 
 Etihad Airways
 Finnair
 KLM 
 LOT Polish Airlines 
 Motor Sich Airlines
 S7 Airlines 
 Ukraine International Airlines

Fleet

Current fleet

, the Belavia fleet consists of the following aircraft:

Historic fleet

Incidents and accidents
On 6 January 2003, a Yakovlev Yak-40 suffered a shattered windshield during a flight, en route to Prague. Two Czech Air Force fighters accompanied the plane to a safe landing in Ruzyně International Airport.
On 14 February 2008, Belavia Flight 1834, a Bombardier CRJ100ER en route from Yerevan, Armenia, to Minsk, hit its left wing on the runway during takeoff from Zvartnots International Airport, subsequently crashing on the ground, flipping over and coming to a stop inverted near the runway. All 18 passengers and 3 crew members managed to escape the aircraft before it erupted into flames, partly due to the timely response of the fire and rescue crew at the airport. The main cause of the crash was icing contamination leading to a stall of the left wing.

References

External links

Official website

Airlines of Belarus
Belarusian brands
Transport in Minsk
Companies based in Minsk
Economy of Minsk
Former Aeroflot divisions
Airlines established in 1996
Government-owned airlines
Belarusian companies established in 1996